EGF-like module-containing mucin-like hormone receptor-like 3 is a protein encoded by the ADGRE3 gene. EMR3 is a member of the adhesion GPCR family.
Adhesion GPCRs are characterized by an extended extracellular region often possessing N-terminal protein modules that is linked to a TM7 region via a domain known as the GPCR-Autoproteolysis INducing (GAIN) domain.

EMR3 expression is restricted to monocytes/macrophages, myeloid dendritic cells, and mature granulocytes in human. Transcription of the EMR3 gene results in two alternative spliced forms: a surface protein with extracellular, 7TM, and intracellular domains as well as a truncated soluble form of only the extracellular domain. Mice, next to Emr2, lack the Emr3 gene.

Function 

The protein may play a role in myeloid-myeloid interactions during immune and inflammatory responses.

Ligands 
A potential ligand of EMR3 likely is expressed on human macrophage and activated neutrophils.

References

External links 
 GPCR consortium

G protein-coupled receptors